Wakefield School is an independent day school located in The Plains, Virginia, with classes ranging from junior kindergarten to 12th grade. It was founded in Huntly, Virginia in 1972 as Wakefield Country Day School, and changed its name to Wakefield School in the early 1980s when it established a small boarding department (boarding was discontinued after a few years). After a disagreement with the founders of the school, the half of the board of trustees moved the school from the Huntly location and re-founded the school at Marshall, Virginia in 1991, and moved later to Archwood Farm in The Plains (the first campus owned by the board of trustees) in 1996. However, the original campus, headed by the original founders, continues to operate as a separate school, Wakefield Country Day School. Between 1996 and today, Wakefield grew from a school of 240 students to the current enrollment of about 332 as the campus was developed.

Wakefield School was first accredited by the Virginia Association of Independent Schools in 2001. It counts among its graduates more than 800 alumni:  1980-1991 from the Huntly campus, 1992-1996 from the Marshall campus, and 1997-the present from The Plains campus. Significant alums include reddit.com and hipmunk.com cofounder Steven Huffman '01.

Wakefield is a member of the Greater Piedmont Athletic Conference (GPAC).

External links
 Wakefield School

Schools in Fauquier County, Virginia
Private high schools in Virginia
Private middle schools in Virginia
Private elementary schools in Virginia
1972 establishments in Virginia
Educational institutions established in 1972